Akel Kayode Clarke (born 25 October 1988) is a professional Guyanese football player. He plays in Jamaica for Mount Pleasant Football Academy.

Career

Club

Clarke has played club football in Guyana, Trinidad, Suriname and Jamaica

International
He made his Guyana national football team debut on 29 May 2011 in a friendly against Barbados, as a starter.

He was selected for Guayana's 2019 CONCACAF Gold Cup squad and started the country's very first game in the history of the tournament against the United States on 18 June 2019.

Despite cancellation of a match in Barbados for the CONCACACF 2021 Gold Cup Qualifiers in March 2020, Clarke maintained a training regiment in preparation for a return to football after COVID-19. Late 2020 he signed with the Red Stripe Premier League club Mount Pleasant Football Academy (based in St. Ann, Jamaica) after release from Western Tigers.

References

External links
 
 

1988 births
Sportspeople from Georgetown, Guyana
Living people
Guyanese footballers
Guyana international footballers
Association football goalkeepers
Guyana Defence Force FC players
St. Ann's Rangers F.C. players
Central F.C. players
North East Stars F.C. players
Fruta Conquerors FC players
S.V. Walking Boyz Company players
TT Pro League players
SVB Eerste Divisie players
Guyanese expatriate footballers
Expatriate footballers in Trinidad and Tobago
Expatriate footballers in Suriname
Expatriate footballers in Jamaica
Afro-Guyanese people
2019 CONCACAF Gold Cup players
Guyanese expatriate sportspeople in Trinidad and Tobago
Guyanese expatriate sportspeople in Suriname
Guyanese expatriate sportspeople in Jamaica